Lanardo Tyner (born August 2, 1975) is an American professional boxer.

Professional career
On December 5, 2009 Tyner lost to the Mexican Canelo Álvarez. All his losses have been quality, coming to Mike Arnaoutis, Lamont Peterson and Canelo Álvarez. Lanardo upset welterweight prospect Antwone "The Truth" Smith in the ninth by knockout.

On January 1, 2011 Tyner announced to Chicago Boxing New's Richard Spilotro that he is willing and able to jump down a weight class and fight at the Junior welterweight division. Many ring insiders believe this move will suit Tyner, mainly due to the size difference he was facing at welterweight.

On July 15, 2011, Tyner defeated the former WBA Jr welterweight champion Vivian Harris during Cynthia Tolaymat's CFC Promotions "Chicago Fight Night #2". With the win, Tyner earned the USBO welterweight title.

On August 18, 2012, Tyner defeated then-undefeated Charles Hatley in a one-round TKO, and won the vacant WBC United States (USNBC) welterweight title.

Professional boxing record

|- style="margin:0.5em auto; font-size:95%;"
|align="center" colspan=8|31 Wins (20 knockouts, 11 decisions), 11 Losses (0 knockouts, 11 decisions), 2 Draws|- style="margin:0.5em auto; font-size:95%;"
|align=center style="border-style: none none solid solid; background: #e3e3e3"|Res.|align=center style="border-style: none none solid solid; background: #e3e3e3"|Record|align=center style="border-style: none none solid solid; background: #e3e3e3"|Opponent|align=center style="border-style: none none solid solid; background: #e3e3e3"|Type|align=center style="border-style: none none solid solid; background: #e3e3e3"|Rd., Time|align=center style="border-style: none none solid solid; background: #e3e3e3"|Date|align=center style="border-style: none none solid solid; background: #e3e3e3"|Location|align=center style="border-style: none none solid solid; background: #e3e3e3"|Notes'''
|-align=center
|-align=center
|Loss|| 35-14-2 ||align=left| Ivan Golub
||| 10 ||   || align=left| 
|align=left|
|-align=center
|Win|| 35-13-2 ||align=left| Gundrick King
||| 5, 1:09 ||   || align=left| 
|align=left|
|-align=center
|Win|| 34-13-2 ||align=left| Andre Byrd 
||| 8 ||   || align=left| 
|align=left|
|-align=center
|Loss|| 33-13-2 ||align=left| Steven Butler 
||| 1, 2:29 ||   || align=left| 
|align=left|
|-align=center
|Loss|| 33-12-2 ||align=left| Winfred Harris Jr. 
||| 8 ||   || align=left| 
|align=left|
|-align=center
|Win|| 33-11-2 ||align=left| Luis Eduardo Florez 
||| 8 ||   || align=left| 
|align=left|
|-align=center
|Win|| 32-11-2 ||align=left| Istvan Dernanecz 
||| 1 ,2:59 ||   || align=left| 
|align=left|
|-align=center
|Loss|| 31-11-2 ||align=left| Antonio DeMarco 
||| 10 ||   || align=left| 
|align=left|
|-align=center
|Loss|| 31-10-2 ||align=left| Lukasz Maciec 
||| 10 ||   || align=left| 
|align=left|
|-align=center
|Loss|| 31-9-2 ||align=left| Chris Pearson
||| 8 ||   || align=left|  
|align=left|
|-align=center
|Win|| 31-8-2 ||align=left| Angel Hernandez 
|||10,2:59 ||   || align=left|  
|align=left|
|-align=center
|Win|| 30-8-2 ||align=left| Tyrese Hendrix
||| 12,2:30 ||   || align=left|  
|align=left|
|-align=center
|Win|| 29-8-2 ||align=left| Gabriel Morris
||| 1,2:58 ||   || align=left|  
|align=left|
|-align=center
|Win|| 28-8-2 ||align=left| Marteze Logan
||| 1,2:37 ||   || align=left|  
|align=left|
|-align=center
|Win|| 27-8-2 ||align=left| Angel Rios
||| 6 ||   || align=left|  
|align=left|
|-align=center
|Win|| 26-8-2 ||align=left| Charles Hatley
||| 1,1:44 ||   || align=left|  
|align=left|
|-align=center
|Loss|| 25-8-2 ||align=left| Dierry Jean
||| 12 ||   || align=left|  
|align=left|
|-align=center
|Loss|| 25-7-2 ||align=left| Jessie Vargas
||| 10 ||   || align=left|  
|align=left|
|-align=center
|Loss|| 25-6-2 ||align=left| Kevin Bizier
||| 12 ||   || align=left|  
|align=left|
|-align=center
|Loss|| 25-5-2 ||align=left| Wale Omotoso
||| 8 ||   || align=left|  
|align=left|
|-align=center
|Win|| 25-4-2 ||align=left| Vivian Harris
||| 10 ||   || align=left|  
|align=left|
|-align=center
|Draw|| 24-4-2 ||align=left| Adrian Granados
||| 8 ||   || align=left|  
|align=left|
|-align=center
|Loss|| 24-4-1 ||align=left| Andre Gorges
||| 8 ||   || align=left|  
|align=left|
|-align=center
|Draw|| 24-3-1 ||align=left| Cristian Favela
||| 8 ||   || align=left|  
|align=left|
|-align=center
|Win|| 24-3-0 ||align=left| Antwone Smith
||| 9,1:15 ||   || align=left|  
|align=left|
|-align=center
|Win|| 23-3-0 ||align=left| Anthony Middlebrooks
||| 4,0:40 ||   || align=left|  
|align=left|
|-align=center
|Win|| 22-3-0 ||align=left| Taronze Washington
||| 8 ||   || align=left|  
|align=left|
|-align=center
|Loss|| 21-3-0 ||align=left| Canelo Álvarez
||| 12 ||   || align=left|  
|align=left|
|-align=center
|Win|| 21-2-0 ||align=left| Rohan Nanton
||| 2,2:55 ||   || align=left|  
|align=left|
|-align=center
|Win|| 20-2-0 ||align=left| Ivan Ledon
||| 2,0:34 ||  || align=left|  
|align=left|
|-align=center
|Loss|| 19-2-0 ||align=left| Lamont Peterson
||| 10 ||  || align=left|  
|align=left|
|-align=center
|Loss|| 19-1-0 ||align=left| Mike Arnaoutis
||| 12 ||  || align=left|  
|align=left|
|-align=center
|Win|| 19-0-0 ||align=left| Victorio Abadia
||| 1 ||  || align=left|  
|align=left|
|-align=center
|Win|| 18-0-0 ||align=left| Wayne Fletcher
||| 4 ||  || align=left|  
|align=left|
|-align=center
|Win|| 17-0-0 ||align=left| Marteze Logan
||| 8 ||  || align=left|  
|align=left|
|-align=center
|Win|| 16-0-0 ||align=left| Armando Córdoba
||| 8 ||  || align=left|  
|align=left|
|-align=center
|Win|| 15-0-0 ||align=left| Kelly Wright
||| 8 ||  || align=left|  
|align=left|
|-align=center
|Win|| 14-0-0 ||align=left| Martinus Clay
||| 8 ||  || align=left|  
|align=left|
|-align=center
|Win|| 13-0-0 ||align=left| Gilbert Venegas
||| 10 ||  || align=left|  
|align=left|
|-align=center
|Win|| 12-0-0 ||align=left| Randy Dodds
||| 2,2:24 ||  || align=left|  
|align=left|
|-align=center
|Win|| 11-0-0 ||align=left| James Merriweather
||| 1,2:55 ||  || align=left|  
|align=left|
|-align=center
|Win|| 10-0-0 ||align=left| Leo Martinez
||| 1,2:42 ||  || align=left|  
|align=left|
|-align=center
|Win|| 9-0-0 ||align=left| Ramon Guevara
||| 1,1:26 ||  || align=left|  
|align=left|
|-align=center
|Win|| 8-0-0 ||align=left| Jose Angel Roman
||| 6 ||  || align=left|  
|align=left|
|-align=center
|Win|| 7-0-0 ||align=left| Kenny Abril
||| 6 ||  || align=left|  
|align=left|
|-align=center
|Win|| 6-0-0 ||align=left| Rodney Robinson
||| 1,2:12 ||  || align=left|  
|align=left|
|-align=center
|Win|| 5-0-0 ||align=left| Alexis Rubin
||| 1,0:54 ||  || align=left|  
|align=left|
|-align=center
|Win|| 4-0-0 ||align=left| Anthony Johnson
||| 1,1:37 ||  || align=left|  
|align=left|
|-align=center
|Win|| 3-0-0 ||align=left| Joe Howard
||| 1 ||  || align=left|  
|align=left|
|-align=center
|Win|| 2-0-0 ||align=left| Carlos Barreras
||| 4 ||  || align=left|  
|align=left|
|-align=center
|Win|| 1-0-0 ||align=left| Danny Lopez
||| 3 ||  || align=left|  
|align=left|

References

External links

Living people
1975 births
American male boxers
Welterweight boxers
African-American boxers
Boxers from Detroit